MyBioSource, Inc. is a biotechnological products distribution company formed to create a large portfolio of laboratory research reagents, both hard to find and common items, with worldwide distributions. Backed by a network of laboratories and manufacturers, the company was launched in 2007 in Vancouver, British Columbia, Canada. Headquarters and operations were relocated to San Diego, United States.

Products
The company distributes a number of science reagents and assay kits, including custom recombinant proteins and antibodies, real time PCR and quantitative ELISA kits. The company's current catalog lists over 1 million individual products used in academic, biotechnological, and pharmaceutical industries.

Peer reviews
According to HighWire, MyBioSource was not cited in any articles, though there are some articles (see below) which brings into question the validity of this search engine's ability to detect "all words".

One peer-reviewed article that compared the specificity of several, commercially-available kits for glucagon and oxyntomodulin found that the MyBioSource assay (MBS701592) for detecting oxyntomodulin "yielded inconsistent results". And another article investigated the specificity of commercially available EIA kits for identification of neutralizing antibodies to adenovirus Ad36 found that "all seronegative samples (as determined by SNA) were false positive" by MyBioSource's Ad36 EIA (MBS705802).

Additionally, most scientists who have experience using these kits (as sold by MyBioSource) do not recommend them and found the customer service to be unhelpful and lacking knowledge of the science as it pertains to the kits.

Publications with MyBioSource products
Bak, M. J., Albrechtsen, N. W., Pedersen, J., Hartmann, B., Christensen, M., Vilsboll, T., Knop, F. K., Deacon, C. F., Dragsted, L. O., Holst, J. J. (2014) Specificity and sensitivity of commercially available assays for glucagon and oxyntomodulin measurement in humans. Eur J Endocrinology 170, 529–538
Dubuisson, O., Day, R. S., Dhurandhar, N. V. (2015) Accurate identification of neutralizing antibodies to adenovirus Ad36, -a putative contributor of obesity in humans. J Diabetes Complications 29, 83–87

References

External links
 Company website

Biotechnology companies established in 2007
2007 establishments in British Columbia
Companies based in San Diego
Biotechnology companies of the United States
Manufacturing companies based in California